Tatsuya Tanaka (born October 27, 1988 in Taipei, Taiwan) is a Japanese figure skater who competes internationally for Hong Kong. Tanaka is the three time Hong Kong national silver medalist. He is a five-season competitor on the Junior Grand Prix circuit.

External links
 
 Tatsuya Tanaka at Hong Kong Skaters Union website

1988 births
Living people
Figure skaters at the 2007 Asian Winter Games
Hong Kong male single skaters
Japanese male single skaters
Hong Kong people of Japanese descent
Sportspeople from Taipei